Fan Ying (born February 12, 1986) is a Chinese table tennis player.

Career records
Singles (as of July 31, 2010)
World Championships: round of 16 (2005).
Pro Tour winner (1): Polish Open 2009. Runner-up (3): German Open 2002; German Open 2005; Slovenian Open 2009.
Asian Championships: SF (2009).
Asian Cup: 1st (2003).

Women's doubles
Pro Tour winner (3): Austrian Open 2002; Slovenian, Polish Open 2009. Runner-up: China (Wuxi) Open 2004; Danish Open 2009.
Pro Tour Grand Finals appearances: 1. Record: QF (2002).
Asian Championships: QF (2009).

Mixed doubles
World Championships: QF (2009).

Teams
Asian Championships: 1st (2009).

References

Chinese female table tennis players
Living people
1986 births
Place of birth missing (living people)
Universiade medalists in table tennis
Table tennis players from Jiangsu
People from Zhenjiang
Universiade gold medalists for China
Universiade silver medalists for China
Medalists at the 2011 Summer Universiade